WeMall, formerly iTrueMart, is the flagship business-to-consumer retail platform of Ascend Group Co. Ltd., with presence in Thailand. It sells products including electronics, mobiles and tablets, cameras, home appliances, personal care and health and beauty products.

History
WeMall started as iTrueMart, initially a local e-commerce player in Thailand in 2014.

Ventures

Thailand
iTrueMart Thailand became the first country venture, growing as a major player in online retail in the country.

Philippines
iTrueMart Philippines was launched on November 15, 2015. It began serving the Luzon region in its inception and expanded to Visayas and Mindanao on April 23, 2016.

The Philippines arm of iTrueMart ceased trading September 9, 2016.

Rebranding
Ascend Group announced the rebranding of iTrueMart to WeMall onJuly 6, 2016 at Sofitel Bangkok as a move to enter the marketplace sector.

References
https://m.wemall.com/itruemart

Online retailers of Thailand
Retail companies established in 2014
Internet properties established in 2014
Companies based in Bangkok
Charoen Pokphand
Ascend Group
Thai brands